Deh Sar is a village in Kiashahr Rural District, Kiashahr District, Astaneh-ye Ashrafiyeh County, Gilan Province, Iran. At the 2006 census, its population was 541, in 157 families.

References 

Populated places in Astaneh-ye Ashrafiyeh County